SMEX may refer to:

 Social Media Exchange, a Lebanese non-governmental organization
 Small Explorers program, a NASA program